William McIntyre may refer to:

 William McIntyre (English cricketer) (1844–1892), English cricketer who played for Nottinghamshire and Lancashire
 William McIntyre (Australian cricketer) (1877-1943), Australian cricketer who played for New South Wales
 William McIntyre (corporal), (1951–1984), a Canadian police officer whose killing remains unsolved
 William McIntyre (judge) (1918–2009), Canadian Puisne Justice of the Supreme Court of Canada
 William McIntyre (minister) (1806–1870), Scottish-Australian Presbyterian minister and educator
 William McIntyre (New Zealand politician) (1881–1949), member of the New Zealand Legislative Council
 William McIntyre (Australian politician) (1869–1902), New South Wales politician
 W. David McIntyre (1932–2022), New Zealand historian
 William Victor McIntyre (1887–1964), New Zealand shepherd, farmer, dog breeder and handler
 Bill McIntyre (actor) (1929–2010), American actor
 Bill McIntyre (Canadian football) (born 1964), Canadian football wide receiver
 Bill McIntyre (footballer) (1897–1971), Australian rules footballer

See also
 William MacIntyre (disambiguation)